Elmer Henry "Bear" Ward (October 13, 1912 – March 26, 1996) was an American football player.  Ward was born in Willard, Utah, and attended Box Elder High School in Brigham City, Utah.  He then enrolled at Utah State Agricultural College where he played college football for the Utah State Aggies football team.  He was selected by the Newspaper Enterprise Association as a first-team center on the 1934 College Football All-America Team. He also played professional football for the NFL champion Detroit Lions during the 1935 NFL season.  He was Utah State's first All-American athlete in any sport, and he was inducted into the Utah Sports Hall of Fame in 1984.  He has also been inducted into the Utah State University Hall of Fame.

References

External links 
 

1912 births
1996 deaths
American football centers
Utah State Aggies football players
Detroit Lions players
Players of American football from Utah
People from Willard, Utah